Stars & Hank Forever is an album by American art rock group the Residents. Released in 1986, it is the second and last album in the American Composer series before its cancellation due to increasing difficulties in maintaining the project.

The track "Kaw-Liga", later issued as a single, samples the rhythm and bassline of Michael Jackson's "Billie Jean" (a reference to country singer Billie Jean Horton, who was married to Williams before his death) and did well in the emerging European club scene, spawning several remixes; it is as close as the Residents ever got to a bona fide commercial hit.

The "Sousaside" features sound effects recorded by Philip Perkins to create the effect of a marching band on a happy occasion; a mix of "Stars and Stripes Forever" without sound effects was released as a B-side to the "Kaw-Liga" single.

Stars & Hank Forever is also the last studio album to feature guitarist Snakefinger, before his early death in July 1987. The Williams song "Six More Miles" has since become a sort of ceremonial number for the Residents, being performed in tribute to Snakefinger in 1987, and recently as an encore in 2018 in tribute to the death of Hardy Fox, one of the founding members of the group.

Track listing

Personnel 

 The Residents – performance, arrangements
 Snakefinger – slide guitar on "Hey Good Lookin

References

The Residents albums
1986 albums
Hank Williams tribute albums
John Philip Sousa
Ralph Records albums